The Golden Bough is a painting from 1834 by the English painter J. M. W. Turner. It depicts the episode of the golden bough from the Aeneid by Virgil. It is in the collection of the Tate galleries.

Background
John Ruskin described The Golden Bough as a sequel to Turner's 1823 painting The Bay of Baiae, which is based on the myth of Apollo and the Cumaean Sibyl.

Description
The painting depicts a scene from book VI of the ancient Roman epic Aeneid by Virgil. Turner has used Christopher Pitt's English translation. The hero Aeneas wants to enter the Underworld to consult his dead father. The Sibyl of Cumae tells him that he needs to offer a golden bough from a sacred tree to Proserpine in order to enter. The painting shows the landscape around the lake Avernus, which is the entrance to the Underworld. The Sibyl stands to the left and holds a sickle and the cut bough. Dancing Fates in the background and a snake in the foreground forebode the mysteries of the Underworld.

Provenance
The collector Robert Vernon bought the painting before it had been exhibited publicly. It was shown at the Royal Academy of Arts in 1834. Vernon gave it to the National Gallery in 1847, and in 1929 it was transferred to the Tate Gallery. It remains in the collection of the Tate galleries, but as of 2020 was not on display.

Legacy
James George Frazer evokes the painting in his book The Golden Bough (1890), which speculatively reconstructs a mental image which according to Frazer connects many myths and religious practices. The book would go on to influence many writers. Turner's painting serves as its frontispiece and is addressed in the opening paragraph:

Who does not know Turner's picture of the Golden Bough? The scene, suffused with the golden glow of imagination in which the divine mind of Turner steeped and transfigured even the fairest natural landscape, is a dream-like vision of the little woodland lake of Nemi, "Diana's Mirror," as it was called by the ancients. No one who has seen that calm water, lapped in a green hollow of the Alban hills, can ever forget it. The two characteristic Italian villages which slumber on its banks, and the equally Italian palazzo whose terraced gardens descend steeply to the lake, hardly break the stillness and even the solitariness of the scene. Dian herself might still linger by this lonely shore, still haunt these woodlands wild.

References

Notes

Sources

1834 paintings
Paintings based on the Aeneid
Paintings by J. M. W. Turner
Collection of the Tate galleries
Dance in art
Snakes in art